originally designated ATR–110, was laid down 14 July 1944 at Levingston Shipbuilding Co., Orange, Texas; launched 16 August 1944; and commissioned 26 October 1944.

Concluding shakedown a month after commissioning, ATA–183 reported to Commander, Panama Sea Frontier, 14 December 1944. Based at Coco Solo, Canal Zone, the ocean tug assisted a variety of vessels transiting the Canal and towed ships to Charleston, SC, and Aruba, Netherlands West Indies.

This necessary duty continued until early 1946 when the craft steamed back to Orange, Tex. for inactivation and decommissioned 22 October. In July 1948, while assigned to the Atlantic Reserve Fleet, ATA–183 was named Nottoway. In 1961 this tug was transferred to the Maritime Administration and placed in the National Defense Reserve Fleet.

References
 
  NavSource Online: Service Ship Photo Archive USS Nottoway (ATA-183)

 

1944 ships
Ships built in Orange, Texas
Sotoyomo-class tugs